Peter Symonds College is a sixth form college in Winchester, Hampshire, in the south of England. Founded as a boys' grammar school, it is one of the few specialist sixth form colleges which is also a boarding school. It serves Falkland Islands residents for sixth form. It is the biggest sixth form college in the UK.

Curriculum 
Most students at Peter Symonds take three A levels, with some taking other vocational courses. General Studies was taken as a compulsory AS and A level on top of this until 2014, when the school dropped the subject. However some students take four or more A levels in their first year and continue with either three or four A levels in their second year. The Level 3 Extended Project Qualification (EPQ) is offered at the college.

Amongst the subjects on offer at the college are Fine Art, Photography, Three-Dimensional Design, Textiles, Biology, Business, Chemistry, Classics, Computing, Criminology, Dance, Drama, Economics, English Language, English Literature, Environmental Studies, Film Studies, French, German, Geography, Politics, Graphics, Health & Social Care, History, ICT, Law, Italian, Mathematics, Further Mathematics, Media Studies, Music, Philosophy, PE, Physics, Product Design, Psychology, Religious Studies, Sociology, Spanish and Statistics. The college is also somewhat unusual amongst state sixth form colleges in offering Latin at both AS and A level.

Courses are available at AS Level, A-level, BTEC Level 2 National Certificate, BTEC Level 3 National Certificate and GCSE at the college.

Admissions 
It has some 4000 students aged 16–18 mainly from central Hampshire, but also British Forces teenagers from Germany and Cyprus, and residents of the Falkland Islands, who live on campus in one of the two boarding houses (Falkland Lodge and School House).. The Falkland Islands Government pays for each student to board at Peter Symonds if they achieve at least five "C" grades in their GCSEs. Therefore, in 2005 principal Neil Hopkins described the institution as "the official sixth-form college for the Falkland Islands". The college also has a separate site in Winchester where it provides courses for some 2000 adult students (see https://ahed.psc.ac.uk/website/psapps/).

In 2005 it had 2,700 full-time students, with about 15-20 from the Falkland Islands; the overall figure is an increase from the 1,200 students in 1993.

College life

Extra-curricular activities 
At one time the college produced an online magazine named The BUZZ, written and edited by students, which replaced Converse in 2008 but has since ceased to circulate. There was a student produced college radio station, 7Radio, operating until roughly 2014. This was revived in 2022, establishing the student-led Symonds Radio, who currently produce ad-hoc programming in partnership with Outreach Radio.

All students at the college must take part in at least one activity, including sports and societies. There are also some accredited activities offered by the college. Students also must take part in a set number of "workshops" each year – these are additional time spent doing work in each subject outside of lessons with teachers. In addition, all students attend the "Symonds Lecture Programme", a replacement for General Studies, in which information is delivered in university-style lectures.

The UK Rock Challenge, Duke of Edinburgh's Award, First Aid, Practical Wildlife Conservation, Choir, Harry Potter Appreciation Society, Libra Foundation, Fencing, Debating and Fantasy Football are all activities on offer at Peter Symonds College.

Sports 
The college has teams in the following sports: athletics, American flag football, badminton, basketball, cheerleading, cricket, cross country, equestrian, football, hockey, lacrosse, netball, rugby, squash, swimming, tennis, skiing, sailing, and volleyball. The college also enters individual players and teams into competitions for the following sports: Golf, table tennis and trampolining.

Students' Union 
The Peter Symonds College Student Union works in conjunction with Student Services to promote student interests alongside organising events for the student body, such as diversity festivals, guest speakers, charity events, concerts and end of year balls. The SU consists of the Executive Committee (President, Vice President, Treasurer, Secretary) and other officers (Canteens and Environment, Entertainments and Charity, Communications, Equality and Diversity, Officer without Portfolio and others). The Students' Union also has a history of organising and coordinating protests and demonstrations on behalf of the student body.

The President of the SU also serves on the Board of Governors as a student governor, along with one other student governor who need not be a member of the Executive Committee. Amongst the roles of the President is to chair the executive committee, and to organise and chair the Student Parliament.

The Students' Union officers are elected at the start of the academic year with the executive committee elected at the year's end. Participation in the elections has been boosted in recent years through the use of an online system accessible through the student intranet, this system was introduced for the first time in the executive committee election of April 2012. The electoral system works on a single transferable vote system, with a re-open nominations option available.

The Student Union is affiliated with the National Union of Students. The college is entitled to send two voting delegates to the Union Conference.

Boarding 
Around eighty students board at the school circa 2005. Students board at the two houses; School House and Falkland Lodge. Boarders are typically from British Armed Forces families or the Falkland Islands. The college and the Falkland Islands government made an agreement for the college to accommodate students from the Falkland Islands. A second boarding house, Falkland Lodge, was built as part of this agreement, and was funded by the Falkland Islands.

There were more boarding houses when the college was a boys' grammar school: Wyke Lodge, which is now the environmental studies block, and Kelso, which is home to the music department.

Academic achievement 
In 2009 Peter Symonds was placed sixth in The Times top 50 state sixth forms. In the same year the college was ranked 85th in the country (only including institutions with at least 30 exam entrants) based on Average Points Score.
And in 2011 the college was placed 4th top 50 state sixth forms in the country.

Circa 2005 the yearly matriculation of students to Cambridge University and University of Oxford, the two most prestigious universities in England, was 40–50.

A2 Results 2015

AS Results 2015

2015 results showed the pass rate remained at 99% and students performed better than last year, with 83% achieving A*-C at A Level.

Headmasters and principals 
 Revd Telford Varley III, 1897 to 1926
 Dr Percy Tom Freeman, 1926 to 1956
 Charles Simpson (acting), 1956 to 1957
 John Shields, 1957 to 1963
 John Ashurst, 1963 to 1972
 John Cooksey, 1972 to 1973
 Stuart Nicholls, 1973 to 1993
 Neil Hopkins, 1993 to 2013
 Stephen Carville, 2013 to 2018
 Sara Russell, 2018–

History

Grammar school 

The college was founded as a boys' grammar school in 1897 and became a coeducational 16–19 college in 1974, although its roots go back to charities established in the 16th century at the bequest of Peter Symonds, a wealthy merchant. From 1944 it was a voluntary controlled grammar school.

Sixth form college 
The school, along with the Winchester County Girls' High School, also a grammar school, became a comprehensive in 1974, becoming a sixth-form college while WCHS became a comprehensive under the name of The Westgate School. The last grammar school intake left in 1979.

Apostrophe 
In the late 1990s or early 2000s, for reasons unknown (but possibly because of the difficulty students and correspondents had in spelling the college's name correctly), the College dropped the possessive apostrophe from its founder's name in its official title, and is now known as Peter Symonds College.

New buildings 
In 2004, the John Shields Building was unveiled, providing classrooms for the computing, psychology and environmental science departments. Also in that year the Varley Sports Café was rebuilt.

The £4.2M Ashurst Learning Resources Centre was completed in the spring of 2007. Ashurst contains five computer suites, housing over 170 computers (three suites double as classrooms, but remain open access when not in use), a library and silent study areas.

The Conlan building was completed in the summer of 2014, this building is used for a variety of subjects including Photography and Business. It includes a green screen which is used by photography and media students.

The Hopkins Building, named after previous principal Neil Hopkins, was previously known as the Ashurst Quad. It sits alongside the Ashurst (LRC) was opened in September 2015, creating more study space for students. The ground floor of the building is dedicated to the provision of computers and student workspaces, whilst the top floor is occupied by the Geography and Latin departments.

Art centre 
The college plans to open a new art complex to replace the current art classrooms. More than 150 local residents have backed a campaign to prevent the construction of the new building. The new complex will be open to the public, and local residents have expressed concerns of a potential safety problem due to the location of a planned new entrance to the college site.

Notable Old Symondians 

 Ben Ainslie—British sailor and four-time (00',04',08',12') Olympic gold medalist, five-time Olympic medalist (4G,1S) – most decorated sailor of all-time. Britain's flag-bearer for London 2012 Closing ceremony.
 Kevin Ashman—professional quiz player.
 Gina Beck—actress, singer, currently playing Miss Honey in the West End production of Matilda the Musical.
 Mike Brown, —Harlequins and England rugby player. 2014 Six Nations Player of the Tournament.
 Jon Boden Folk singer and former lead singer and main arranger for Bellowhead.
 Andy Burrows—former drummer in the band Razorlight.
 Laura Carmichael—British actress, best known for her role as Lady Edith Crawley in popular TV series Downton Abbey
 Benjamin Cawston Professional Racquets Player. Current World number 1 (May 2022) and two times US Open Champion
 Will Champion—drummer in the band Coldplay.
 Alexa Chung—TV presenter, model and fashion designer.
 Julia Copus Poet and children's writer.
 Jack Dee—Stand up comedian and actor.
 Mark Easton __ the Home Editor for BBC news broadcasting on national television and radio news since 2004, also a published author noted for his book titled Britain (2012)
 William Easton artist and writer
 Edward Eveleigh—High Court judge
 Philippa Forrester – Television presenter.
 Bernard Harrison (1934-2006) - Footballer/Cricketer 
 Ben Hart (magician)__ Magician and Britain's got Talent finalist. 
 Tom Hayes (trader) - Former trader who was arrested, tried, sentenced to 14 years in prison for role in the Libor Scandal
 Nigel Healey—Vice Chancellor, Fiji National University
 Air Chief Marshal Sir Patrick "Paddy" Bardon Hine GCB, GBE—Senior Royal Air Force commander. Commander of all British forces during the first Gulf War.
 Dermot Hudson – Chairman of United Kingdom Korean Friendship Association
 Phil Hughes—cricketer
 Jing Lusi—British actress
Joe Marchant __ rugby player.
 Caroline Nokes—Conservative MP since 2010 for Romsey and Southampton North
 Christian O'Connell—Radio presenter on The Christian O'Connell Breakfast Show on Absolute Radio
Chance Perdomo – British actor, known for Killed by My Debt (2018) and as Ambrose Spellman on the Netflix series the Chilling Adventures of Sabrina
 Iain Percy—British sailor and double Olympic champion.
 Lucy Pinder—glamour/nude model and Celebrity Big Brother housemate
 James Buckley Thorp __ Founder of fashion corporation Rupert and Buckley
 Sam Youd __ a British writer, best known for science fiction under the pseudonym John Christopher, including the novel The Death of Grass.

See also
 Education in the Falkland Islands

References

External links 

 Peter Symonds College website
 EduBase
 Weeke history

Education in Winchester
Learning and Skills Beacons
Educational institutions established in 1897
Sixth form colleges in Hampshire
Boarding schools in Hampshire
1897 establishments in England
Education in the Falkland Islands